Osečany is a municipality and village in Příbram District in the Central Bohemian Region of the Czech Republic. It has about 300 inhabitants.

Administrative parts
The village of Velběhy and the hamlert of Paseky are administrative parts of Osečany.

References

Villages in Příbram District